Mubarik Mubarik is a Balochi and Punjabi-language song sung by Atif Aslam and Banur band performed in season 12 (episode three) of Coke Studio Pakistan. The Balochi lyrics are traditional folk verses while the Punjabi lyrics were penned by Atif Aslam.

The lyrics of the song are mix of two aspects of Balochi music and poetry, 'haalo (come) and naazek (celebrate)'. The song is about celebration, wedding and showcases Baloch culture. The song, musically includes a Balochi counterpart of Eastern Classical raags.

Atif Aslam said:

Credits 
 Song – Mubarik Mubarik
 Artists – Atif Aslam & Banur's Band
 Starring – Atif Aslam, SM Baloch, Chakar Baloch & Usman Withd
 Lyricists – Atif Aslam & Chakar Baloch
 Composer – Usman Withd
 Producer – Rohail Hyatt
 Label – Coke Studio

See also 
 Tajdar-e-Haram
 Aaye Kuch Abr

References 

Atif Aslam songs
2019 songs
Coke Studio (Pakistani TV program)
Pakistani folk songs
Punjabi-language songs
Songs written by Atif Aslam
Balochi-language songs